Mladen Zeljković (born 18 November 1987) is a Serbian professional footballer who plays as a right-back for Montenegrin First League club Dečić.

Career
Zeljković started playing in 2008 at Novi Sad, after which he played for Proleter Novi Sad and Palić. In 2012, he went across the border to play in the Bosnian Premier League with Radnik Bijeljina. He later had stints with Borac Banja Luka and Željezničar.

In 2015, Zeljković went abroad to play in the Canadian Soccer League for Waterloo Region. After a season in Canada, he returned to Radnik in 2016. He won the Bosnian Cup and two Republika Srpska Cups while at the club.

In 2017, he signed with Alashkert of the Armenian Premier League. He featured in the 2017–18 UEFA Champions League against Santa Coloma and BATE Borisov. In the 2017–18 season, Zeljković helped Alashkert to win the league title. In the 2018–19 season, Zeljković won the Armenian Supercup and the 2018–19 Armenian Cup as well. He left Alashkert in December 2019 after his contract with the club expired.

In January 2020, Zeljković came back to Bosnia and Herzegovina and joined Čelik Zenica. He made his official debut for Čelik in a 2–0 league loss against Zrinjski Mostar on 23 February 2020. On 3 July 2020, Zeljković left Čelik and joined Serbian SuperLiga club Napredak Kruševac.

Honours
Radnik Bijeljina
Bosnian Cup: 2015–16
Republika Srpska Cup: 2015–16, 2016–17

Alashkert
Armenian Premier League: 2017–18
Armenian Cup: 2018–19
Armenian Supercup: 2018

References

External links

1987 births
Living people
Footballers from Novi Sad
Serbian footballers
Serbian expatriate footballers
Association football defenders
RFK Novi Sad 1921 players
FK Proleter Novi Sad players
FK Palić players
FK Radnik Bijeljina players
FK Borac Banja Luka players
FK Željezničar Sarajevo players
SC Waterloo Region players
FC Alashkert players
NK Čelik Zenica players
FK Napredak Kruševac players
FK Dečić players
Serbian First League players
Premier League of Bosnia and Herzegovina players
Canadian Soccer League (1998–present) players
Armenian Premier League players
Serbian SuperLiga players
Expatriate soccer players in Canada
Expatriate footballers in Armenia
Expatriate footballers in Bosnia and Herzegovina
Expatriate footballers in Montenegro
Serbian expatriate sportspeople in Canada
Serbian expatriate sportspeople in Armenia
Serbian expatriate sportspeople in Bosnia and Herzegovina
Serbian expatriate sportspeople in Montenegro
Montenegrin First League players